La Tuque Airport  is a registered aerodrome located adjacent to La Tuque, Quebec, Canada.

See also
 La Tuque Water Aerodrome

References

Registered aerodromes in Mauricie
La Tuque, Quebec